A provocation test, also called a provocation trial or provocation study, is a form of medical clinical trial whereby participants are exposed to either a substance or "thing" that is claimed to provoke a response, or to a sham substance or device that should provoke no response. An example of a provocation test, performed on an individual, is a skin allergy test.

See also
 Blind experiment
 Control group

Design of experiments
Clinical pharmacology
Epidemiology